The Chüemettler is a mountain of the Appenzell Alps, overlooking the Walensee in the canton of St. Gallen. It lies south of the Speer and southeast of the Federispitz mountains. Chüe literally means cows in Swiss-German language, Mettler is a family name respectively a term used as name of several local areas.

References

External links

 Chüemettler on hikr.org

Mountains of Switzerland
Mountains of the canton of St. Gallen
Mountains of the Alps
Appenzell Alps